This is a bibliography of works on the Latter Day Saint movement.

General

Overviews
 
 As part of the celebration of the 100th anniversary of the Mormon pioneers' arrival in the Salt Lake Valley, LDS church president George Albert Smith tasked Hinckley (then employed as the Executive Secretary to the Church Radio, Publicity, and Mission Literature Committee) to write a book which would introduce the Church to non-members; it is divided into two sections— "The Mormons Today: A Contemporary Picture" and "The Mormons Yesterday: Their History"; beginning in 1969, the Church began publishing the historical part alone under the title Truth Restored: A Short History of The Church of Jesus Christ of Latter-day Saints.
  
 A semiofficial encyclopedia for topics relevant to the LDS Church. Published in four volumes, with an optional fifth volume containing the "Standard Works."
 
 A compact (144 pages) history of the LDS Church, and survey of contentious issues in contemporary Mormonism; an installment in the Very Short Introductions book series by an eminent historian and practicing Mormon.
 
 Scholarly analysis of the religion's origins and development; written by a cultural historian, who is a leading authority on Mormonism (yet not a member of the faith).
 
 By journalists who sought to write "a candid but non-polemical" overview of the Mormon world; investigates the LDS Church's finances.
  
 A sociological analysis of the previous forty years of Mormon history and a cultural "retrenchment" among Mormons— against assimilation.
  
 A collection of the viewpoints of contemporary Mormons in America, on their beliefs, rituals, and practices; also their views on race, ethnicity, social class, gender, and sexual orientation.
  
 A study of the Mormons and their religion by a non-member sociologist; includes an account of LDS theology, with an analysis of the Book of Mormon.

History
 
 A single-volume history covering the LDS Church down to 1991. Commissioned by the Church Historical Department; it puts the history of the Church in the context of its times. First published on the one-hundredth anniversary of Joseph Fielding Smith's birth; it was subject to some controversy within the Church, with some considering it not "spiritual enough."
  Originally entitled History of Joseph Smith; a revised edition was published in seven volumes under the title History of the Church of Jesus Christ of Latter-day Saints from 1902–1932; it is currently published under the shortened title. 
 A semi-official history of the early Latter Day Saint movement during the lifetime of Joseph Smith. It is largely composed of Smith's writings with interpolations and editorial comments by Smith's secretaries and scribes; and, after Smith's death, historians of the LDS Church.
  
 Single volume history produced by the LDS Church; written by an Apostle.
 
 Collection of six personal and church histories written, dictated, or closely supervised by Smith; including accounts of his first vision of Deity, ministering of the angel Moroni, discovery of the gold plates and translation of the Book of Mormon, bestowal of priesthood authority, an account of the "Missouri Mormon War", and Smith's original Articles of Faith.
  
 A collection including the first three years of what survives of Joseph Smith's papers, including letters sent and received, revelations, minutes of meetings, deeds and other financial papers, records of ecclesiastical administration; covering documentation of key events including the translation and publication of the Book of Mormon, the establishment of a church, and the mission by Oliver Cowdery and others to preach to American Indians on the western frontier of the United States.
 
 A six-volume history by a general authority and Assistant Church Historian of the LDS Church.
 
  An examination of the first two decades of LDS history and the move from Joseph Smith's charismatic spontaneity, and the egalitarian chaos of the early church, to Brigham Young's well-defined structure and the bureaucratization of Mormonism.
 
 A compilation of fifteen brief essays on new insights found in the previously unavailable minutes of the Council of Fifty; historians who analyze the records include Richard Lyman Bushman, Richard E. Turley Jr., Spencer W. McBride, Patrick Q. Mason, Benjamin E. Park, Nathan B. Oman, Gerrit J. Dirkmaat, R. Eric Smith, Matthew J. Grow, Marilyn Bradford, Jeffrey D. Mahas, Matthew C. Godfrey, Christopher James Blythe, Richard E. Bennett, Jedediah S. Rogers, and W. Paul Reeve.
 
 A collection of essays on influential Mormons in American popular culture; in cinema, television, drama, theater, and music; with specific chapters on Disney, Philo T. Farnsworth, the Hill Cumorah Pageant, the Mormon Tabernacle Choir, Rose Marie Reid, and a selection of Mormon actors.
  
 A collection of essays about primitive Christianity, with particular focus on the connection between the practices and the doctrines of the early Church and the LDS Church.
 
 A study of the office of Presiding Patriarch in the LDS Church; chronicling its history.

Mormon studies

  
 A collection of 15 essays taking a new look at events in Mormon history— such as the significance of the First Vision, the Nauvoo period, the miracle of the gulls, and Mormon polygamy; contributors include Leonard J. Arrington, Mario S. De Pillis, James B. Allen, Jan Shipps, Robert Bruce Flanders, Linda King Newell, Dean May, William G. Hartley, Maureen Ursenbach Beecher, Stanley S. Ivins, Eugene E. Campbell, Bruce L. Campbell, Kenneth L. Cannon II, Klaus J. Hansen, Thomas G. Alexander, Ronald W. Walker, and B. H. Roberts.
  
 A historiographical survey of how the writing of Mormon history has evolved since the establishment of the church; a companion volume to the bibliography, Studies in Mormon History, 1830–1997; includes a contribution by Armand Mauss.
 
 A bibliography on historical literature about the Mormons; listing books, articles, theses, and dissertations on the history of the LDS Church.
 
 Compilation of fourteen essays on history and the Mormons by Arrington, the first professional historian to serve as Church Historian, and a prominent founder of the New Mormon history; includes a biographical sketch by Walker, a bibliography of his works and speeches by Whitaker, and a personal tribute by his daughter, Susan Arrington Madsen.
  
 A study of the early history of the Church, introducing readers to groups and individuals who seem to have anticipated its kind of religious primitivism, especially the Seekers (who resembled Mormonism's concept of authority during its formative years).
  
 Survey of Mormon history and doctrine; recounting the church's origins, explaining the evolution of the Mormon vision, and its place in American public life.
 
 Seventeen articles on a range of topics including David O. McKay's personality, comparisons of John Humphrey Noyes with Joseph Smith, Wilford Woodruff's vision of the signers of the Declaration of Independence, a "Mormon Bigfoot", Mormon ritual healing, the campaign to suppress anti-Mormon motion pictures, Mormon representations of Judaism, Mormon women's fiction, Edward Tullidge and the women of Mormondom; contributors include Kathleen Flake, Newell Bringhurst, Claudia Bushman, and Douglas Davies.
  
 A collection of essays with topics include Joseph Smith's political economy, Jane James's place in LDS history, the young Joseph Smith and Presbyterianism, the relation of Pentecostalism to Mormonism in the case of John Alexander Dowie, some comparative observations of Islam and Mormonism, the Ex-Mormons For Jesus/Saints Alive In Jesus, who Elias is, and LDS engagement with Dead Sea Scrolls scholarship; contributors include David Charles Gore, Quincy D. Newell, John Matzko, D. William Faupel, Grant Underwood, Sara M. Patterson, Stevan Davies, Eric F. Mason, and Richard Lyman Bushman.
  
 A history of the development of Mormon doctrines and the attempt to develop a communal utopia under a theocratic government during the 1830s and early 1840s; an interpretation of the LDS movement as a reaction to the diminishing role of religion in an emerging democratic, competitive, and increasingly secular world.

Regional studies

Britain
  Republished on 13 May 2009.
 History of the Quorum of the Twelve's mission to the United Kingdom.
 
 A collection of 16 biographical, local, background, and general articles on Mormonism in the British Isles, emphasizing the period of 1840 to the late 1850s; written by a mix historians of British history, and of American history.

Denmark
 
 Story of the social and cultural ramifications of Danish conversions to Mormonism; explores the range of Danish public reactions over a seventy-year period.

Italy
 
 An account and analysis of the people, events, and issues relevant to LDS missionary efforts in Italy.

Pacific Islands
 
 A compilation of scholarly research, personal reminiscences, and faith stories of LDS Church missionary work among the Pacific Islands from 1843 onward; including articles on the work in French Polynesia and Tonga, influence on Maori religious identity, the founding of Iosepa, a rich history in Hawaii, the site selection of the Church College of Hawai'i campus, the art and architecture of the Laie Hawaii Temple (and a purported 7 December 1941 attack attempt), and reflections on the Polynesian Cultural Center).
  
 Collection of articles and remembrances on the history of the LDS Church throughout the Pacific Islands up to the year 2004; including an address by Gordon B. Hinckley, an article on Matthew Cowley, the cultural foundations of the Polynesian Cultural Center, George Q. Cannon's mission in Hawai'i, and David O. McKay's 1921 trip around the Pacific.

Japan
 
 Study of the early history LDS Missionary efforts in Japan; the challenges of adapting their message to the cultures encountered in East Asia.

Korea
 
 Collection of essays about the LDS Church in Korea.

American South
  
 History of late nineteenth century Anti-Mormonism in the American South; which sometimes rose to the level of vigilante violence.

Sacred Works

The Book of Mormon

  
 A reader-friendly version reformating the complete, unchanged 1920 text in the manner of modern translations of the Bible, with paragraphs, quotations marks, poetic forms, topical headings, multichapter headings, indention of quoted documents, italicized reworkings of biblical prophecies, and minimized verse numbers; also featuring a hypothetical map based on internal references, an essay on Book of Mormon poetry, a full glossary of names, genealogical charts, a basic bibliography of Mormon and non-Mormon scholarship, a chronology of the translation, eyewitness accounts of the gold plates, and information regarding the lost 116 pages and significant changes in the text.
  
 An analysis of the work's narrative structure; takes readers through its characters, events, and ideas, as it explores the story and its messages; seeks to reconcile believing and nonbelieving readings by offering a literary approach.
 
 Mostly written with a beginner in mind; it makes a case for Joseph Smith's description of the Book of Mormon as "the most correct of any book on earth, and the keystone of our religion," and that "a man would get nearer to God by abiding by its precepts, than by any other book."

Others
 
 Presents the text of the Book of Genesis, Book of Moses, and Book of Abraham into 186 events or episodes placed in chronological sequence; in an effort to present the primeval history of the Genesis creation narrative in a comprehensive harmonized structure.

Criticism

 
 Examination of the contents of the Book of Mormon, challenging the claim of ancient origin; by a retired CES instructor and Institute director.
  
 Biographical sketch of Joseph Smith with background information about the origin of the Book of Mormon; posits the idea that Smith used the 1823 work View of the Hebrews as a source of ideas in creating the Book.
  
 Critical examination of the Egyptian papyri from which Joseph Smith purportedly translated the Book of Abraham.

Beliefs and practices

 
 A series of essays examining the theology and doctrine of the LDS Church; written primarily as an introduction for non-members; an overview of the LDS views of God, scripture, Jesus, the nature and destiny of man, grace and salvation, the sacraments, the priesthood, the purpose of the temples, revelation and eschatology.
  
 A set of seven lectures on the doctrine and theology of the Church of Jesus Christ of Latter Day Saints, first published as the doctrine portion of the canonical Doctrine and Covenants, but later removed from that work; originally presented to a group of Elders in a "School of the Prophets" course in the early winter of 1834–35 in Kirtland, Ohio.
  
 Collection of pronouncements by the Second President of the LDS Church, primarily from the Journal of Discourses, arranged by topic.
  
 Collection of teachings from the 6th president of the LDS Church (from 1901 to 1918); first published as a course of study for Melchizedek Priesthood quorums.
  
  
 Viewed by the LDS Church as a classic text on its teachings and beliefs concerning the life and ministry of Jesus; by an Apostle.
   
 Three volume collection on an array of gospel topics by then President of the Quorum of Twelve; the nature of our life in the pre-existence; the true story of creation; the age of the earth; the theory of evolution and the Gospel; the Adam-God theory; distinguishing between true and false revelation.
  
 A lengthy reference work combining doctrine and history; each chapter summarizes a particular doctrine followed by scriptural references from the standard works, and any relevant statements from Joseph Smith; a favorite of field missionaries at the time.
  (Originally subtitled A Compendium of the Gospel). 
 An encyclopedic work written by a general authority of the LDS Church; intended primarily for a LDS audience, it covered a wide array of gospel topics in much detail; very popular among average Church members.
    
 Originally serialized in the LDS Millennial Star, this basic instructional work was very popular among Latter-day Saints.
 
 An attempt to consolidate the author's "theological thought into a unified whole and to reconcile science with scripture." Deemed too controversial by the LDS First Presidency and Quorum of the Twelve, it went unpublished for over 60 years.
 
  A detailed study of early Mormon thought about the "end times"; exploring early LDS interpretation of the Bible and the Book of Mormon affecting Mormon millennial doctrines.
  
 A controversial book by one of the September Six and his wife (who some view as a "seventh" member of the Six); explores a range of theological issues, such as the nature of God, gender roles, religious authority, and symbolism.
 
 Philosophical study of the similarities between Mormonism and Hellenistic Christianity; and Mormonism's contribution to the overall pursuit of life's fundamental, ontological questions.
 
 Collection of sermons and writings by Spencer W. Kimball, a LDS Apostle (from 1943 to 1985) and Church President (from 1973 to 1985); quotations aiming to provide instruction and inspiration on a wide range of gospel topics.
    
 A series of letters from Rev. Crowell (a Baptist former colleague) inquiring about Spencer's conversion to the Mormon faith, together Spencer's responses.
   
 Summarizes the Great Apostasy from the viewpoint of the LDS Church; was once one of the few non-scriptural books which full-time LDS missionaries were encouraged to study; it has gone through many editions and continues to be published.
 
 A self-improvement book, by then president of the LDS Church; foreword by Mike Wallace.

Special topics

Death
 
 An approach to the subject of death from both a medical and a theological point of view by a (then) LDS Apostle; discussing topics such as the purpose of life and of death; the purpose of mourning; factors of choice, such as suicide, euthanasia, and use of mechanical means to extend life; and life after death.
 
 Narrative history of the foundational beliefs of early Mormonism; interpreting them through the lens of Joseph Smith's preoccupation with death.

Evolution

  
 Challenge to the "hypothesis of organic evolution"; written by the then President of the Quorum of the Twelve Apostles of the LDS Church.
 
 Compilation of all known authoritative statements by LDS Church leaders on the topics of evolution and the origin of human beings; with historical context for the statements.
 
 A review the scientific data about how life developed on Earth, written for a general LDS audience.
  
 Compilation of essays on the theological implications of science, by LDS scientists.
  
 Historical survey of the LDS Church's varied relationship to science.

Occult aspects
 
 Study of the role of 19th-century New England folk magic lore in Joseph Smith's early visions and in the development of the Book of Mormon.
 
 An exploration of Mormon cultural and religious history through a collection of folklore, supernatural legends and events; including stories of Cain as a Bigfoot, the Gadianton robbers, UFOs, the Dream Mine, and an Utah version of Nessie.
  
 A history of the roots of Mormon theology; contending that its origins lie in the fusion of radical religion with occult ideas.

Politics

  
 Analysis of the Reed Smoot hearings and their impact on the "Mormon Problem."
 
 A detailed description of the campaigns of 11 Mormons (including ex-Mormons and soon-to-be Mormons) who ran for the presidency of the United States; it includes the third-party runs of Joseph Smith (1844), Parley P. Christensen (1920), Ezra Taft Benson (1968), Eldridge Cleaver (1968), Sonia Johnson (1984), and Bo Gritz (1992); and the major-party runs of George Romney (1968), Mo Udall (1976), Orrin Hatch (2000), Mitt Romney (2008) and 2012) and Jon Huntsman (2012).

Polygamy

  
 Biographical look at each of the 33 women who married Joseph Smith.
 
 First of three volumes, collecting essays on the relationship of Joseph Smith to Fanny Alger, analysis of Section 132 of the LDS Doctrine and Covenants (including the RLDS Church's reaction), Joseph Smith and polyandry; contributors include Todd M. Compton, Ugo A. Perego, and Linda King Newell.
 
 Second of three volumes, collecting essays on plural marriage as practiced by Brigham Young, the plural wives of Prophets from Young to Heber J. Grant, Strangites, William Smith, Lyman Wight, Alpheus Cutler, nineteenth-century Mormon female activism, the incarceration of Mormon plural wives, and the RLDS Church's directive on baptism of Saora tribal polygamists; contributors include George D. Smith and Richard P. Howard.
 
 Third of three volumes,  collecting seventeen original essays on the history of plural marriage among fundamentalist Mormons—who persisted in the practice after LDS Church President Wilford Woodruff's 1890 Manifesto; provides a history of mainstream LDS polygamy in Mexico, John Taylor's controversial 1886 Revelation, portraits of fundamentalist Mormon leaders such as Joseph White Musser, Rulon C. Allred, Rulon T. Jeffs, and Warren S. Jeffs, the 1980s schism between the FLDS church and Centennial Park Community, the 2008 Texas raid on the FLDS YFZ Ranch, and modern media stereotyping of Mormon polygamy, the changing style of fundamentalist clothing and hair styles.

Race

 
 A collection of articles about Black people and Mormonism, race and the LDS priesthood, and the experience of Black Mormons.
  
 A study of Mormonism's struggle for status and recognition, in the context of how Protestants racialized Mormons.
  
 A study of the history of evolving Mormon concepts of race.
 
 The stories of Black Mormons who emigrated to Utah; such as Jane Manning James, Elijah Abel, and Liz Flake Rowan.
 
 Study of the Lamanite Placement Program.
  
 A collection of thirty official or authoritative Church statements on the status of African Americans in the LDS Church; with editorial comments and analysis, contextualizing each within the history of race and religion in the US.
  
 Collection of essays by the editors, and Newell G. Bringhurst, most of which originally appeared in Dialogue.
  
 Study of the evolution of traditional Mormon beliefs and practices concerning minorities; examining how members of the LDS Church have defined themselves and others in terms of racial lineages.
 
 A molecular biologist's explanation of DNA research on Native Americans and Polynesians origins, conflicting with standard LDS Church teachings.

Sexuality

 
 Perspectives of a self-described "happy gay Mormon"; a brother of LDS Apostle D. Todd Christofferson, who left the Church, and then returned to it.
  
 Historical survey the tolerance of same-sex relationships by the LDS Church, before the onset of homophobia in the late 1950s.
  
 Collection of 13 essays on the evolution of Mormon attitudes about sexual practices (including homosexuality), polygamy, and celestial marriage; authors include Eugene England and Levi S. Peterson.
  
 Once popular work about the atonement, repentance, and the plan of salvation by a, then, Apostle of the LDS Church; controversial for its treatment of masturbation, homosexuality, premarital sex, and rape.

Temples
    
 Published by the LDS Church, it discusses the doctrine, purpose, and importance of temples; the first book to contain photographs of the interiors of Mormon temples (including those in Kirtland, Nauvoo, Salt Lake, St. George, Logan, and Manti).
 
 LDS Apostle discusses the doctrine and purpose of the temples, including an explanation of the entrance requirements; also explains why Church teachings focus on family history and genealogy; Deseret Book published an extended, illustrated version of the book in 2007.

Violence

  
 History of the Mountain Meadows Massacre.
 
 History of the Mountain Meadows Massacre; the author posits that Brigham Young ordered the massacre.
  
 Account of the Mountain Meadows Massacre; written drawing from LDS Church documents previously not available to scholars.
 
 A reproduction of two of the collections uncovered during research for Massacre at Mountain Meadows; one compiled in the 1890s by Andrew Jenson, the second a decade later by David H. Morris (1858–1937), an attorney and judge in St. George, Utah.
  
 Investigation of the histories of the LDS Church, and the crimes of a small splinter group called the School of Prophets; also examines the ideologies of both the LDS Church and the fundamentalist Mormon polygamous groups, such as the FLDS Church.
  
 The story of the Mark Hofmann case, told from the perspectives of the murder victims and the LDS Church; written by an Assistant Church Historian with church leaders' support and access to interviews, diaries, journals, memoranda, and other records.

Women

 
 Comprehensive history of the Relief Society, produced by the LDS Church; written by Susan W. Tanner.
  
 Collection of essays compiled by a Mormon feminist theologian, exploring issues of women's spirituality and authority within the Mormon church; the Mormon concept of a mother in heaven; and the relationship of Mormon women and priesthood. Contributors include Linda King Newell, Meg Wheatley, Todd Compton, Lavina Fielding Anderson, Carol Lynn Pearson, D. Michael Quinn, and Margaret Merrill Toscano.
  
 A collection of writings and speeches from four decades of the modern Mormon feminist movement; a guide to understand the history of gender in Mormonism. Contributors include Claudia Lauper Bushman, Sonia Johnson, Linda King Newell, Carol Cornwall Madsen, Laurel Thatcher Ulrich, Mary Lythgoe Bradford, Margaret Merrill Toscano, Linda Sillitoe, Carol Lynn Pearson, Janice Merrill Allred, Chieko Nishimura Okazaki, Lisa Butterworth, Valerie Hudson Cassler, Neylan McBaine, Kate Kelly, and Lani Wendt Young.
 
 A collection of articles by twenty-five scholars and activists on the issue of gender equality in the LDS Church; examines the high public visibility of the Ordain Women movement, and details the theological debates about gender and priesthood authority.
 
 Biography of Eliza R. Snow, 2nd President of the Relief Society (from 1866 to 1887).
 
 A survey of the involvement of Mormons in the women's movement  (including early Utah leaders such as Emmeline B. Wells) and the shift to championing a more conservative view of women's roles; culminating in the concerted effort to defeat the Equal Rights Amendment (ERA).
  
 A history of marriage and family life among first-generation Latter-day Saints; focused on the world of early Mormon women— pieced together through diaries, letters, albums, minute-books, and quilts— their practice of "plural marriage," and their attainment of female suffrage.
 
 A collection of essays on the experience of LDS women in a predominantly male-led church; topics include Jane Manning James, Mother in Heaven, and the intersecting paths of Mormon and Roman Catholic feminists; contributors include lay members and scholars, including both LDS and non-LDS viewpoints: Catherine Brekus, Laurel Thatcher Ulrich, Rachel Cope, Jennifer Reeder, Kristine Wright, Jonathan Stapley, Susanna Morrill, Quincy D. Newell, Amanda Hendrix-Komoto, Rebekah Ryan Clark, David E. Campbell, Carine Decoo-Vanwelkenhuysen, Melissa Wei-Tsing Inouye, Jennifer Finlayson-Fife, Claudia Bushman, P. Jane Hafen, Neylan McBaine, Aimee Evans Hickman, and Mary Farrell Bednarowski.

Criticisms

  
 Contemporary exposé of early Mormonism; considered to be the first anti-Mormon book; republished as History of the Mormons in 1840.
  
 Evangelical Christian response to the challenge of Mormon apologetics; scholarly effort to rebut Mormon truth claims.
  
 Critique of FARMS scholarship; by a CARM researcher.
  
 Examination of the presence and reception of the Mormon image in contemporary culture; how nineteenth- and twentieth-century American writers frequently cast the Mormon as a stock villains in fiction; the updated edition has an expanded final chapter, on the Mormon presence in contemporary American culture, discussing the musical, The Book of Mormon, and the political campaigns of Mitt Romney and Jon Huntsman.
  
 An analysis of the careers of 18 converts who later left the LDS church— David Whitmer, John Corrill, William E. McLellin, Francis Gladden Bishop, James Colin Brewster, William B. Smith, Alpheus Cutler, Stephen Post, James and George Dove, Henry W. Lawrence, Frank J. Cannon, Joseph W. Musser, Fawn McKay Brodie, Maurine Whipple, Richard Price, Jerald and Sandra Tanner, and Sonia Johnson; contributors include Richard N. Holzapfel, John S. McCormick, Kenneth M. Godfrey, William D. Russell, Dan Vogel, and Jessie L. Embry.
 
 A chronicle of the author's journey out of the LSD faith; and an exposé by a civil trial attorney, alleging fraud committed by generations of Mormon Leaders— misrepresentations resulting in damages (political, environmental, and psycho-social) to believers; presents The Book of Mormon as a 19th-century work of fiction

Relations to other faiths

 
 Overviews a variety of the world's religions with commentary following each one; offering a LDS perspective, noting beliefs held in common, and divergences.
 
 Collection of papers from a BYU symposium in October 1981; focuses on parallels, similarities, and contrasts with Islam and the LDS. Revised edition includes new material by Arnold H. Green and Daniel C. Peterson.
 
 A monograph by a Pentecostal New Testament scholar offering an irenic, critical reading of the Book of Mormon; utilizing narrative analysis, it investigates of the book's overall structure; presents an extended reading focused on its literary and theological dimensions; and traces the book's reception amongst followers and opponents alike.

Missionary work

 
 A collection of essays bringing some of the stories of missionaries of the LDS Church to the study of Mormon missiology; the result of a BYU Church History Symposium.

Branches and sects

 
 Discusses the histories and theologies of more than a hundred different churches, organizations, and individuals in the Latter Day Saint movement.
 
 A collection of sixteen original essays on different expressions of the Latter Day Saint movement; including groups which trace their path through Sidney Rigdon, Lyman Wight, James J. Strang, Alpheus Cutler, Granville Hedrick, David Whitmer, William Smith, and Amasa Lyman; outlines the history of fundamentalist Mormonism, and recent schisms within the Reorganized Latter Day Saint tradition. Includes contributions from Danny L. Jorgensen, Anne Wilde, and Roger D. Launius.

Community of Christ (RLDS Church)

 
 A history, by the daughter of RLDS Apostle and Church Historian Heman C. Smith.
 
 History of the RLDS Church, published by the Church.

Others
  Foreword by Jan Shipps. Republished by the University of Utah in 2009. 
 Chronicle of the Godbeites and their 1870s challenge to Brigham Young's leadership and authority; a collective biography of William S. Godbe, Elias L. T. Harrison, Edward W. Tullidge, Fanny and Thomas Stenhouse, Amasa M. Lyman, Henry W. Lawrence, and Eli B. Kelsey.

Biographies
  
 A four-volume biographical dictionary by an Assistant Church Historian; includes a church chronology and biographical information about leaders and other prominent members of the LDS Church from its founding in 1830 until 1930.

Joseph Smith

  
 Collection featuring Joseph Smith's first five journals; providing Smith's perspective on the Kirtland Temple, the origins of the "Missouri Mormon War", and the founding of what would become Nauvoo, Illinois.
  
 Collection featuring Smith's first Nauvoo, Illinois journal, as well as part of the second; chronicling the organization of the Female Relief Society of Nauvoo, proxy baptism for the dead, publication of the Book of Abraham, construction of the Nauvoo Temple, agitation from dissenters such as John C. Bennett, and an attempts to have Smith extradited to Missouri for trial.
  
 Collection featuring journal entries from the last year of Smith's life; discussing topics including humanity's potential to become like God, establishment of the Council of Fifty, Smith's candidacy for United States president, and escalating conflict against Smith and the church. Includes appendixes with accounts from Willard Richards and William Clayton of the murder of Joseph and Hyrum Smith.
  
 Republished under several titles, including History of Joseph Smith by His Mother
  
 Known as the first important non-hagiographic biography of Joseph Smith; continually in print for over seven decades.
 
 A scholarly attempt at an objective portrayal of Joseph Smith by a historian of the Jacksonian era; part of the Penguin Lives book series.
  
 A biography of the formative years, covering the period of Smith's life up until 1831; argues that Smith was a pious fraud, interpreting the Book of Mormon as springing from his psychology and experiences.
  
 The first biography ever written on Joseph Smith; a hostile account.
 
 Faithful biography presenting Smith "as a greater leader than Moses and a greater prophet than Isaiah.
  
 Comprehensive biography by a Mormon historian; described as having a temperate, balanced, middle-of-the-road approach— in the spectrum of pro and con biographies.

Brigham Young
  
 Admiring biography of Brigham Young, the 2nd President of the LDS Church (from 1847–1877); nicknamed the "American Moses" because he led his followers in an exodus through a desert, to what they saw as a promised land.
. 
 Part of the Library of American Biography Series. Republished on 24 January 1997 by Longman.

Others
  
 Award-winning biography of Emma Smith.
  
 Faithful biography of Heber C. Kimball, by his grandson.
  
 Essay collection discussing Heber J. Grant's life and service; from his birth to middle age, prior to becoming the 7th President of the LDS Church (from 1918 to 1945).
  
 Biography of David O. McKay, the ninth president of the LDS Church (from 1951 to 1970).
  
 Biography of the life of the youngest son of Joseph and Emma Smith, David Hyrum Smith.
  
 Biography of the founder of the RLDS Church, Joseph Smith III, which he led from 1860 until his death in 1914.
  
 Biography of Spencer W. Kimball, the 12th President of the LDS Church (from 1973 to 1985), written by his son; focused exclusively on Kimball's ministry at Church President.
 
 Biography of J. Reuben Clark; focused on his time as an attorney and government servant, prior to being called as a Counselor in the First Presidency (from 1933 to 1961).
 
 Collective biography of fathers of the leaders of the LDS Church; including Joseph Smith Sr., John Young, James Taylor, Aphek Woodruff, Oliver Snow III, Hyrum Smith, Jedediah Morgan Grant, John Henry Smith, David McKay, Joseph F. Smith, Samuel Marion Lee Jr., Andrew Kimball, George Taft Benson Jr., John William "Will" Hunter, Bryant S. Hinckley, and George Spencer Monson.
 
 J. Reuben Clark's life and impact (intellectual and administrative) as counselor to three LDS Church presidents.
 
 Biography of Russell M. Nelson, the seventeenth President of the LDS Church; a collection of personal reminiscences, written by a former secretary to the First Presidency, drawing on more than sixty years of association with President Nelson; the eighth and final part of the series entitled Remembering the Prophets of God.

Personal accounts
  
 Autobiography of a convert to the LDS Church, who participated in the rescue of handcart companies during the winter of 1856, worked with the Native American and Mexican peoples, and was an early settler of what became Mesa, Arizona.
  
 Account of John Lowe Butler, an early convert from Kentucky; bodyguard to Joseph Smith, Danite in the Missouri conflict, missionary to the Sioux, Nauvoo polygamist and Legionnaire, frontiersman and bishop of Spanish Fork during the Mormon Reformation and the Utah War.
 
 Biography of Anson Bowen Call (1863–1958); bishop of Colonia Dublán, a Mormon colony in Chihuahua, Mexico.
 
 Personal story of a woman, raised LDS, who leaves the Church after discovering doctrinal problems.
  
 A memoir of a LDS woman's marriage to a gay man who died of AIDS in 1984.
  
  An assemblage of writings about the Latter-day Saints by a preeminent non-Mormon interpreter of Mormonism; combination of a portrait of the evolution of contemporary Mormonism (from a provincial to a universal belief system), with an intellectual autobiography of her personal encounters.
  
 Memoir of growing up in a devoutly LDS home; growing older and coming to wrestle with some tenets of the Church (including its stance on women's rights and homosexuality).

See also
List of Latter Day Saint periodicals

References

Latter Day Saints

Christian bibliographies
Latter Day Saint texts